Andrew Dewar (born 3 March 1971) is a South African cricketer. He played in seven first-class and three List A matches for Border from 1992/93 to 1994/95.

See also
 List of Border representative cricketers

References

External links
 

1971 births
Living people
South African cricketers
Border cricketers
Cricketers from East London, Eastern Cape